The Hamburg cell or Hamburg terror cell was, according to U.S. and German intelligence agencies, a group of radical Islamists based in Hamburg, Germany, that included students from different Arab countries who eventually came to be key operatives in the 9/11 attacks. Important members included Mohamed Atta, who led the four hijacking teams in 2001 and piloted American Airlines Flight 11; Ramzi bin al-Shibh, who conspired with the other three members but was unable to enter the United States; Marwan al-Shehhi, who piloted United Airlines Flight 175; and Ziad Jarrah, who piloted United Airlines Flight 93 and failed to hit a target in Washington, D.C. (claimed by Khalid Sheikh Mohammed to have been the Capitol). Other members included Said Bahaji, Zakariya Essabar, Mounir el-Motassadeq, and Abdelghani Mzoudi.

Background
On November 1, 1998, future-hijackers Mohamed Atta, Marwan al-Shehhi, and Ramzi bin al-Shibh moved into an apartment (two bedrooms, one living room, one kitchen) together on Marienstraße. Here they formed the secretive Hamburg cell, which also included other minor participants in the 9/11 plot. They met together three or four times a week to discuss their anti-American and anti-Israeli views, and to decide how best to fight for their cause.

As late as 1999, the four core members of the group had intended to wage jihad in Chechnya, where Islamic jihadists were rebelling against Russia. The 9/11 Commission Report notes in Chapter 5 that "according to bin al-Shibh [who is now in U.S. custody], a chance meeting on a train in Germany caused the group to travel to Afghanistan instead. An individual named Khalid al Masri (or Khalid al-Masri) approached bin al-Shibh and Shehhi (because they were Arabs with beards, bin al-Shibh thinks) and struck up a conversation about jihad in Chechnya. When they later called Masri and expressed interest in going to Chechnya, he told them to contact Abu Musab in Duisburg, Germany. Abu Musab turned out to be Mohamedou Ould Slahi, a significant al-Qaeda operative who, even then, was well known to U.S. and German intelligence, though neither government apparently knew he was operating in Germany in late 1999."

Bin al-Shibh, Shehhi and Jarrah visited Slahi in Duisburg, where he convinced them that it would be best to train in Afghanistan first, because further experience would be useful, and anyway it was difficult at that time to get into Chechnya. Slahi instructed them to travel to Karachi, Pakistan, then to the Taliban office in Quetta, Pakistan, where they were to contact a man named Umar al Masri. Atta and Jarrah left Hamburg during the last week of November 1999. Shehhi left by himself around the same time; bin al-Shibh followed two weeks later.

"Umar al Masri" turned out to be a nonexistent person. The name was a code word that instructed members of the Taliban office to escort the men to Kandahar, Afghanistan, where they were convinced to join the al-Qaeda network and wage jihad against America. They met with Osama bin Laden himself and swore their loyalty to him. Mohamed Atta was chosen by Bin Laden as the leader of the group that would attack America; Atta would contact Bin Laden several more times before the attacks. The men then returned to Germany to enroll in flight training school, and later moved on to flight training schools in the United States at the recommendation of one of their instructors based in Germany.

The members of the Hamburg Cell were a boon to the 9/11 plot, which Khalid Shaikh Mohammed had proposed to Bin Laden in 1996. The Hamburg students were fluent in English, educated, accustomed to the Western lifestyle, radically Islamic, and capable of learning to pilot aircraft. "Bin Laden and Mohammed Atef wasted no time in assigning the Hamburg group to the most ambitious operation yet planned by al-Qaeda," the 9/11 Commission Report says.

Many al-Qaeda members lived in the Hamburg apartment at various times. In all, 29 men listed the apartment as their home address while Mohamed Atta's name was on the lease. Reportedly, Khalid Shaikh Mohammed visited the apartment repeatedly.

German intelligence monitored the apartment, but did not find any evidence against the residents. Both the United States' Central Intelligence Agency and German Intelligence have received criticism for failing to share information on these and other al-Qaida members.

Hamburg Cell film
The film Hamburg Cell is a docudrama on the planning and execution of the attacks. A co-production between Channel 4 in the UK and CBC in Canada, it was shown in the UK during September 2004, amid criticism that this was too close to the anniversary of the attack. Using computer-generated imagery, the film's producers were able to show the twin towers of the World Trade Center, before the attack, in the background. Ziad Jarrah is featured calling his girlfriend, Aysel Sengün, from a public telephone at the airport, repeating the words 'I love you' over and over.

See also
 Planning of the September 11 attacks

External links
Chapter of the 9/11 Commission Report detailing the history of the Hamburg Cell
Hawala. An Informal Payment System and Its Use to Finance Terrorism by Sebastian R. Müller (Dec. 2006)]  

 
1998 establishments in Germany
2001 disestablishments in Germany
Organisations based in Hamburg
Organizations established in 1998
Organizations disestablished in 2001
Groups affiliated with al-Qaeda
1990s in Hamburg
2000s in Hamburg
Islamic terrorism in Germany
Mohamed Atta

Sunni Islamists